Bulinus octaploidus is a species of gastropod in the Planorbidae family. It is native to Ethiopia.

References

Bulinus
Endemic fauna of Ethiopia
Taxonomy articles created by Polbot